Rajput (from Sanskrit raja-putra 'son of a king') is a large multi-component cluster of castes, kin bodies, and local groups, sharing social status and ideology of genealogical descent originating from the Indian subcontinent. The term Rajput covers various patrilineal clans historically associated with warriorhood: several clans claim Rajput status, although not all claims are universally accepted. According to modern scholars, almost all Rajputs clans originated from peasant or pastoral communities.

Lineages

Genealogies of the Rajput clans were fabricated by pastoral nomadic tribes when they became sedentary. In a process called Rajputization, after acquiring political power, they employed bards to fabricate these lineages which also disassociated them from their original ancestry of cattle-herding or cattle-rustling communities and acquired the name 'Rajput'.
There are three basic lineages (vanshas or vamshas) among Rajputs. Each of these lineages is divided into several clans (kula) (total of 36 clans). Suryavanshi denotes descent from the solar deity Surya, Chandravanshi (Somavanshi) from the lunar deity Chandra, and Agnivanshi from the fire deity Agni. The Agnivanshi clans include Parmar, Chaulukya (Solanki), Parihar and Chauhan.

Lesser-noted vansh include Udayvanshi, Rajvanshi, and Rishivanshi. The histories of the various vanshs were later recorded in documents known as vamshāavalīis; André Wink counts these among the "status-legitimizing texts".

Beneath the vansh division are smaller and smaller subdivisions: kul, shakh ("branch"), khamp or khanp ("twig"), and nak ("twig tip"). Marriages within a kul are generally disallowed (with some flexibility for kul-mates of different gotra lineages). The kul serves as the primary identity for many of the Rajput clans, and each kul is protected by a family goddess, the kuldevi. Lindsey Harlan notes that in some cases, shakhs have become powerful enough to be functionally kuls in their own right.

Suryavanshi (Ikshvaku) lineage of Rajputs 
Solar dynasty or the Ikshvaku dynasty was founded by the King Ikshvaku. Shri Ram was also belonged to the Ikshvaku Dynasty, The 21 Tirthankars of Jainism were born in this dynasty. According to Buddhist texts and tradition, Gautama Buddha descended from this dynasty

Suryavanshi Rajput Clans

Kachhwaha
Mahthans
Rathore
Vadhel
Gohil
Sisodiya
Mori Rajputs
Gahadavala
Nikumbh
Bargujar 
Gaur
Bundela
Sarmal
Jamwal
Sikarwar
Pundir
Dodiya
Minhas
Bisen
Kalhans

Chandravansh lineage of Rajputs 
The Chandravanshi lineage (Somavanshi or Lunar Dynasty) claims descent from Chandra, The lineage is further divided into Yaduvansh dynasty descendents of King Yadu and Puruvansh dynasty descendents of King Puru.

Chandravanshi Clans

Tomar or Tanwar
Chandel
Chavda
Bais
Jhala
Katoch
Janjua
Banaphar
Sengar
Dor
Gautam
Jethwa
Raksel
Pathania

Yaduvanshi Clans

Bhati
Jadeja
Jadaun
Karchul Haihay
Chudasama
Samma

Agnivanshi lineage of Rajputs 

The Agnivanshi lineage claim descent from Agni, the Hindu god of fire.

Agnivanshi Clans

Parihar
Parmar (Panwar)
Chauhan
kirar
Solanki (clan)

Battalion (Regiment) Clans of Rajputs

In medieval Indian history, Rajputs made several regiments, special battalions and mercenaries specially during Rajput Era to fight against foreign invaders which consisted of Rajput soldiers from some or all Rajput clans. Their descendents still use those regiment Rajput surnames

Regiment Clans

Purbia
Purbiya (or Purabia) are Rajput  led mercenaries and soldiers from the eastern Gangetic Plain – areas corresponding to present-day western Bihar and eastern Uttar Pradesh.
Khavas

36 royal races

The 36 royal races (Chathis Rajkula) is a listing of Indian social groups purported to be the royal (ruling) clans of several states and Janapads spread over northern Indian subcontinent. Among the historical attempts at creating a comprehensive listing of the 36 are the Kumarapala Prabandha of  Acharya Jinamandan Gani of 1435 AD, Prithviraj Raso of uncertain date, and Colonel James Tod, writing in 1829.

Kumarapala Prabandha list
The Kumarpal Prabandha (about the reign of Kumarapala Solanki of Chaulukya dynasty r. 1143-1172 CE) list gives 36 clans. It starts with dynasties mentioned in the classics, Surya and its Ikshvaku sub-branch, Chandra and its Yadu ( Yadava ) branch. It also mentions some of the later famous clans: Parmar, Chauhan, Chaulukya (Solanki), Pratihara  Ratt, Chandela and Pala. It also mentions other Deccani dynasties like Shilahara, Chapotkata, Nikumbh etc. Many of the names are less known. Notably, it includes the Maurya. Kumarpal Prabandha was consulted by Tod, he refers to it as Kumarpal Charit.

Tod's list
A listing of the 36 was attempted by Tod in his 1829 work Annals and Antiquities of Rajasthan (volume 1). The "races" are further subdivided into 157 branches ( i.e. sakhas), and genealogical, cultural, and geographic information given for each, though some of the sakhas are extinct.

The principal ones like the Ghilote having 24 sub-branches, the Tuar or Tanwar or Toor 17, the Rathor 13, the Parmara 35, the Chamhan or Chauhan 26, the Challook or Solanki 16, and the Pratihara 12. Each sakha has its Gotracharya of genealogical creed describing the characteristics, religious practices, and the locale of the clan.

As early as 1872, Tod's list was criticised in the Calcutta Review:

Tod listed the Jats as one of the 36 royal races. The Persian form of the ancient term Jit is Jatt (जट्ट) with short vowel and double short ‘t’. Tod included "Raj Pali" on the list and described them as Aheer or Ahir.

See also
 Caste system in India
 Guhila dynasty
 Rajput & Kshatriya
 History of Rajasthan
 List of Indian monarchs
 List of Rigvedic tribes
 Sisodia & Sisodias of Mewar
 List of Rajput dynasties and states
 Chundawat & Shaktawat & Ranawat

References

Bibliography

External links
 Rajasthan and the Rajputs
The Thirty-six Royal Races of Rajput at Kipling.org